James McLeish Reid (born 29 December 1961) is a Scottish singer/songwriter and the lead singer for the alternative rock band The Jesus and Mary Chain, which he formed with his elder brother and guitarist William Reid in 1983.

Career

The Jesus and Mary Chain

Reid is the lead singer and founding member of the alternative rock band The Jesus and Mary Chain. They released six studio albums before they split up in 1999. They reformed in March 2007.

Freeheat

Reid went on to form the band Freeheat with former Mary Chain drummer Nick Sanderson and guitarist Ben Lurie. Freeheat did several tours and released an EP, Retox, before the members went their separate ways in 2003.

Solo
Reid released his first solo single "Song for a Secret" in 2005 on the Transistor record label, and released a follow up called "Dead End Kids" in July 2006 also on Transistor. Since April 2006 he has been playing with a new band that features Phil King (Felt, Lush, Jesus and Mary Chain) on lead guitar, Loz Colbert (Ride) on drums and Mark Crozer on bass. The band has performed his new material at several low key gigs including Whelans in Dublin and, later, the Carling Bar Academy in Islington.

Personal life
Reid was born in East Kilbride, a suburb of Glasgow, and attended Hunter High School. He now lives in Sidmouth, Devon with his wife Julie Reid and has two daughters Candice and Simone.

Discography

The Jesus and Mary Chain

Freeheat

Solo
 "Song for a Secret" – single (2005)
 "Dead End Kids" – single (2006)

References

1961 births
Living people
Alternative rock guitarists
Alternative rock singers
British alternative rock musicians
Scottish baritones
21st-century Scottish male singers
Scottish rock guitarists
Scottish male guitarists
Scottish rock singers
The Jesus and Mary Chain members
People from East Kilbride
20th-century Scottish male singers